Cyllene is a genus of sea snails, marine gastropod mollusks in the family Nassariidae, the nassa mud snails or dog whelks.

Species
Species within the genus Cyllene include:
 Cyllene angsanana K. Martin, 1921
 Cyllene cernohorskyi Fernandes & Rolán, 1992
 Cyllene concinna A. Adams, 1851
 Cyllene desnoyersi (Basterot, 1825) 
 Cyllene fuscata A. Adams, 1851
 † Cyllene gracilenta (Yokoyama, 1928)
 Cyllene grayi Reeve, 1846
 Cyllene lactea Adams & Angas, 1864
 Cyllene lamarcki Cernohorsky, 1975
 Cyllene lugubris Adams & Reeve, 1850
 Cyllene orientalis A. Adams, 1851
 Cyllene owenii Gray in Griffith & Pidgeon, 1834
 Cyllene parvula Bozzetti, 2014
 † Cyllene pretiosa Vredenburg, 1924
 Cyllene pulchella Adams & Reeve, 1850
 Cyllene royana (Iredale, 1924)
 Cyllene rubrolineata Sowerby, 1870
 Cyllene sibogae Schepman, 1911
 Cyllene smithi K. Martin, 1884
 Cyllene sulcata Sowerby, 1859
 Cyllene unimaculata A. Adams, 1855
 Cyllene vredenburgi Gupta, 1930

 Species brought into synonymy  
 Cyllene glabrata A. Adams, 1851 : synonym of Cyllene pulchella Adams & Reeve, 1850
 † Cyllene helvetica Peyrot, 1927: synonym of  † Cyllenina helvetica (Peyrot, 1927)
 Cyllene japonica Pilsbry, 1904 : synonym of Cyllene concinna A. Adams, 1851
 Cyllene lamarcki Cernohorsky, 1975 : synonym of Cyllene desnoyersi lamarcki Cernohorsky, 1975
 Cyllene lyrata Lamarck: synonym of Cyllene desnoyersi lamarcki ; synonym of Cyllene lamarcki Cernohorsky, 1975
 Cyllene lyratum (Lamarck, 1822) : synonym of Cyllene desnoyersi lamarcki Cernohorsky, 1975
 Cyllene oblonga Schepman, 1911 : synonym of Cyllene pulchella Adams & Reeve, 1850
 Cyllene pallida A. Adams, 1851 : synonym of Cyllene grayi Reeve, 1846
 Cyllene plumbea Sowerby, 1859 : synonym of Cyllene grayi Reeve, 1846
 Cyllene senegalensis Petit de la Saussaye, 1853 : synonym of Cyllene owenii Gray in Griffith & Pidgeon, 1834
 Cyllene striata A. Adams, 1851 : synonym of Cyllene pulchella Adams & Reeve, 1850
 Cyllene sulcata H. Adams & A. Adams, 1854: synonym of Cyllene sulcata G. B. Sowerby II, 1859
 Cyllene varians Cossmann, 1903 : synonym of Cyllene grayi Reeve, 1846
 Cyllene (Cyllene) bantamensis Oostingh, 1939 : synonym of Cyllene pulchella Adams & Reeve, 1850
  Cyllene (Cyllene) lyrata (Lamarck, 1822) : synonym of Cyllene desnoyersi lamarcki Cernohorsky, 1975
  Cyllene (Cyllene) varians Cossman, 1903 : synonym of Cyllene grayi Reeve, 1846

References

 Cernohorsky W. O. (1984). Systematics of the family Nassariidae (Mollusca: Gastropoda). Bulletin of the Auckland Institute and Museum 14: 1–356.

External links

Nassariidae
Gastropod genera